The 2010 PartyCasino.com Premier League was a professional non-ranking snooker tournament that was played from 2 September to 28 November 2010.

Shaun Murphy was the defending champion, but Ronnie O'Sullivan defeated him 7–1 in the final.

Prize fund 
The breakdown of prize money for this year is shown below:
Winner: £30,000
Runner-up: £15,000
Semi-final: £5,000
Frame-win: £1,000
Century break: £1,000 (only in league phase)
Maximum break: £25,000
Total: £200,000

League phase 

Top four qualified for the play-offs. If points were level then most frames won determined their positions. If two players had an identical record then the result in their match determined their positions. If that ended 3–3 then the player who got to three first was higher. (Breaks above 50 shown between (parentheses); century breaks are indicated with bold.)

 2 September – Southampton Guildhall, Southampton, England
 Shaun Murphy 5–1 Ding Junhui → 71–(51), 69–38, 0–128 (65, 63), (124)–0, (55) 86–31, (109)–0
 Ronnie O'Sullivan 3–3 Marco Fu → 4–70 (63), (76, 61) 137–0, 34–71, (119) 141–0, 0–(87), (103)–36
 16 September – Plymouth Pavilions, Plymouth, England
 Mark Selby 2–4 Mark Williams → (101)–3, (84) 85–0, 0–(113), 52–61, 0–82, 3–73
 Ronnie O'Sullivan 3–3 Ding Junhui 8–128 (122), 71–33, (119)–0, 0–95 (89), (67)–7, 44–53
 30 September – Guildhall, Preston, England
 Marco Fu 4–2 Shaun Murphy → (76)–(55), 0–84, 0–83 (77), 68–54, (67) 72–1, 60–(55)
 Ding Junhui 3–3 Mark Williams → 36–76 (54), 0–90 (73), (68)–21, (65)–16, 16–63, 73–5
 Neil Robertson 2–4 Mark Selby → 25–67 (53), (69) 79–8, 0–108 (104), 55–74, (78)–0, 0–123 (119)
 7 October – Brentwood Leisure Centre, Brentwood, England
 Mark Selby 2–4 Ding Junhui → 0–123 (54, 69), (50) 70–49, 0–(78), 9–74 (69), 1–(103), (97)–0
 Ronnie O'Sullivan 3–3 Shaun Murphy → 71–66, 5–104 (90), (93)–0, 15–72 (71), 51–64, (110)–0
 14 October – Inverness Leisure Centre, Inverness, Scotland
 Mark Selby 5–1 Marco Fu → (90)–0, 24–101 (68), (64) 98–0, (53) 72–40, (131)–0, (90)–0
 Neil Robertson 3–3 Mark Williams → 53–59, 79–39, 0–78 (70), (55) 82–25, 7–109 (105), (65) 73–1
 21 October – Spiceball Leisure Centre, Banbury, England
 Neil Robertson 6–0 Ding Junhui → (120)–0, 74–33, 72–44, 97–12, (87)–7, (51) 73–25
 Marco Fu 3–3 Mark Williams → 63–45, 45–54, 0–125 (104), (51) 66–9, (78) 122–8, 0–(122)
 28 October – Penrith Leisure Centre, Penrith, England
 Marco Fu 5–1 Ding Junhui → 94–2, 81–21, 65–0, (94)–5, 0–77 (71), (107)–20
 Ronnie O'Sullivan 4–2 Mark Williams → (98) 99–0, (78) 123–0, 16–61, (70) 74–38, (50) 103–15, 4–78
 4 November – Hutton Moor Leisure Centre, Weston-super-Mare, England
 Marco Fu 4–2 Neil Robertson → 44–82 (70), 77–12, 58–(57), 83–82, (67) 74–39, 28–(90)
 Shaun Murphy 3–3 Mark Selby → (80)–0, 0–(100), (52, 58) 114–3, 19–60, 0–(91), 96–64 (56)
 11 November – Grimsby Auditorium, Grimsby, England
 Shaun Murphy 4–2 Mark Williams → (64) 69–36, (97) 101–0, 0–84 (54), 69–58, 61–58, 63–35
 Ronnie O'Sullivan 5–1 Neil Robertson → (80) 83–40, 85–20, (84) 128–0, (130) 134–0, 32–64, (79)–(59)
 18 November – Venue Cymru, Llandudno, Wales
 Ronnie O'Sullivan 5–1 Mark Selby → (56) 67–49, 68–43, (80) 87–12, 48–79, (116)–4, 66–52
 Shaun Murphy 2–4 Neil Robertson → 56–17, 33–(67), 0–(116), (98) 108–0, 0–(124), 29–70 (52)

Play-offs 
27–28 November – Potters Leisure Resort, Hopton-on-Sea, England

* (61) 74–34, 8–91 (65), (82) 90–0, (139)–0, (102)–0, (77) 78–52 (51)
** (83)–0, 70–5, 0–116 (103), 0–(81), 0–(97), 0–97 (69), 0–72 (68)
*** (74) 81–12, (123)–0, (59) 82–34, 84–32, 67–35, 43–68, (68) 77–0, (51) 83–28

Qualifiers

The qualification for this tournament, the Championship League was played in eight groups from 4 January to 25 March 2010.

Century breaks

 139, 130, 123, 119, 119, 116, 110, 103, 102  Ronnie O'Sullivan
 131, 119, 104, 101, 100  Mark Selby
 124, 120, 116  Neil Robertson
 124, 109, 103  Shaun Murphy
 122, 113, 105, 104  Mark Williams
 122, 103  Ding Junhui
 107  Marco Fu

References

External links
 

2010
Premier League
Premier League Snooker